The 2012–13 network television schedules for the five major English commercial broadcast networks in Canada covers primetime hours from September 2012 through May 2013. The schedule is followed by a list per network of returning series, new series, and series canceled after the 2011–2012 season, for Canadian, American and other series.

CBC Television was the first to announce its fall schedule on May 10, 2012, followed by Citytv on May 29, 2012 and Global on May 30, 2012; this will be followed by CTV and CTV Two on May 31. As in the past, the commercial networks' announcements come shortly after the networks have had a chance to buy Canadian rights to new American series.

Legend 
 Light blue indicates Local Programming.
 Grey indicates Encore Programming.
 Light green indicates sporting events.
 Orange indicates movies.
 Red indicates Canadian content shows, which is programming that originated in Canada.
 Magenta indicates series being burning off and other irregularly scheduled programs, including specials.
 Cyan indicates Various Programming.

Schedule 
 New series are highlighted in bold.
 All times given are in Canadian Eastern Time and Pacific Time (except for some live events or specials). 
Most CBC programming airs at the same local time in all time zones, except Newfoundland time (add 30 minutes).
For commercial stations in the Central Time Zone, subtract one hour.
For commercial stations in the Atlantic and Mountain time zones, add one hour for programming between 8:00 and 10:00 PM. Programs airing at 10:00 PM ET/PT will generally air at 8:00 PM local on stations in these areas. For viewers in the Newfoundland time zone, add an additional 30 minutes to the Atlantic time schedule. 
Notwithstanding the above, timeslots may occasionally vary further in some areas due to local simultaneous substitution considerations, compliance with watershed restrictions, or other factors.

Sunday

Monday

Tuesday

Wednesday

Thursday

Friday

Saturday

By network

CBC Television 

Returning series:
 Dragons' Den
 Doc Zone
 The Fifth Estate
 Heartland
 Hockey Night in Canada
 The National
 Marketplace
 The Nature of Things
 Rick Mercer Report
 This Hour Has 22 Minutes
 The Big Decision
 Who Do You Think You Are?

Arrived series:
 Murdoch Mysteries (moved from Citytv)

New series:
Cracked
Over the Rainbow
Titanic: Blood and Steel

Not returning from 2011–12:
Battle of the Blades
Being Erica
Michael: Tuesdays and Thursdays

Returning series:
 Coronation Street

New series:

Not returning from 2011–12:
 Jeopardy!
 Wheel of Fortune

Citytv

New series:
The Bachelor Canada
Package Deal
Seed

Not returning from 2011–12:
Beyond Survival
Murdoch Mysteries (moved to CBC Television)
The Quon Dynasty

Returning series:
2 Broke Girls
30 Rock
Community
Don't Trust the B---- in Apartment 23
Fringe
Happy Endings
How I Met Your Mother
Last Man Standing
The Middle
Modern Family
New Girl
Parks and Recreation
Person of Interest
Private Practice
Revenge
Scandal
Suburgatory

New series:
1600 Penn
666 Park Avenue
Ben & Kate
The Carrie Diaries
The Goodwin Games
How to Live with Your Parents (for the Rest of Your Life)
Hannibal
Malibu Country
The Mindy Project
Partners
Revolution
Next Caller

Not returning from 2011–12:
Dussault Inc. (moved to The Biography Channel)
Extreme Makeover: Home Edition
Man Up!
The Playboy Club
Terra Nova
Work It
GCB
The Glass House
Alcatraz

CTV/CTV Two

New series:
Motive

Returning series:
Flashpoint

Not returning from 2011–12:
Sanctuary

Returning series:
The Amazing Race
America's Next Top Model
The Big Bang Theory
Blue Bloods
Castle
Criminal Minds
CSI: Crime Scene Investigation
CSI: NY
Dateline NBC
Grey's Anatomy
Grimm
Hot in Cleveland
Law & Order: Special Victims Unit
The Mentalist
Mike & Molly
Nikita
Once Upon a Time
Shark Tank
Two and a Half Men
The Vampire Diaries
The Voice
Up All Night
Whitney
The X Factor

New series:
Anger Management
Arrow
Do No Harm
Emily Owens, M.D.
The Family Tools
The Following
Golden Boy
The Mob Doctor
Nashville
The Neighbors
The New Normal
Zero Hour
Red Widow

Not returning from 2011–12:
CSI: Miami
Desperate Housewives
Man Up!
Pan Am
The Protector
Unforgettable
Who's Still Standing?
Smash

Global

New series:
Close Up

Returning series:
16:9
Recipe to Riches

Returning series:
American Dad!
Bob's Burgers
Bones
The Cleveland Show
Family Guy
Glee
The Good Wife
Happily Divorced
Hawaii Five-0
Kitchen Nightmares
NCIS
NCIS: Los Angeles
The Office
Parenthood
The Simpsons
Survivor
Touch

New series:
Chicago Fire
Elementary
Go On
Guys with Kids
Last Resort
Made in Jersey
Vegas
Friend Me
Deception
Camp

Not returning from 2011–12:
A Gifted Man
Awake
Allen Gregory
Harry's Law
House
How to Be a Gentleman
I Hate My Teenage Daughter
Prime Suspect
Ringer
NYC 22
3
Napoleon Dynamite

Top weekly ratings 
 Note: English Canadian television only by viewers age 2 and up
 Data sources: BBM Canada official website

References 

2012 in Canadian television
2013 in Canadian television
Canadian television schedules